Red Hot Organization (RHO) is a not-for-profit, 501(c) 3, international organization dedicated to fighting AIDS through pop culture.

Since its inception in 1989, over 400 artists, producers and directors have contributed to over 15 compilation albums, related television programs and media events to raise donations totaling more than 10 million dollars for HIV / AIDS relief and awareness around the world.

The Red Hot Organization Collection was donated to Fales Library in New York City in 2006.

Mission
Red Hot is a not-for-profit production company that has produced 16 albums and dedicated more than 10 million dollars to worthy organizations, causes and pro-social projects around the world. Its mission is to raise awareness and money to fight AIDS/HIV and related health and social issues. In 2010, donations from the proceeds of its latest album alone surpassed $1 million mark—with funds going to benefit: Partners In Health, Casey House, Citta, Camp AmeriKids, Out Youth, Housing Works, AIDS Resource Center of Wisconsin, A Loving Spoonful, San Francisco AIDS Foundation, Old Town Clinic run by Central City Concern, After Hours, Nebraska AIDS Project, Advocates for Youth, PSI Youth, UK THT / Crusaid, Breakthrough Cincinnati, the Clinton Health Access Initiative, and Bronx AIDS Services.

Red Hot is more of a creative production company than a traditional charitable organization. Overhead is kept to a minimum and production focused on making innovative projects that target hard to reach audiences by using popular culture and artful propaganda. Revenues from these projects are given to traditional charities, often in collaboration with the artists who have contributed their music or art.

"What is significant is their fund raising does not compete with local AIDS service organizations. They tap basically new money, and that's very important." Furthermore, the contracts Red Hot signs with artists guarantees that at least 80% of the profits generated from the album sales will be earmarked for AIDS efforts.

John Carlin, Paul Heck, and Béco Dranoff are key persons associated with the organization.

Early history

First founded as King Cole, Inc. by Leigh Blake and John Carlin, Red Hot was established in 1989 in response to the devastation wrought by AIDS on a generation of New York artists and intellectuals. Carlin, who first pursued a career as an entertainment lawyer had an "improbable dream: to create an AIDS charity album with pop stars singing Cole Porter songs."

In 1990, the dream was realized when Red Hot + Blue was released, featuring such stars as David Byrne, Annie Lennox, Tom Waits, U2 and Erasure. Carlin, 43 at the time, couldn't believe he pulled it off: "That CD was inspired by naïveté and sheer will." Red Hot + Blue ultimately sold over 1 million copies worldwide, and raised millions of dollars for AIDS charities such as AmFAR and ActUp. The release of Red Hot + Blue became the template for many charity projects that followed. Its one-and-a-half-hour TV special, hosted by Richard Gere, Carrie Fisher and Kyle MacLachlan aired on World AIDS Day during prime time on ABC.

The 1990s
The 1990s were a hotbed of activity for Red Hot. In 1992, Red Hot produced the second in the series: Red Hot + Dance features remixes and original tracks by major club artists, remixed by some of the most influential DJs and producers in the world. It also contains three original tracks by George Michael, including the international smash hit "Too Funky," and "Supernatural (Original Arms House Mix)" with Madonna. For the Dance project, Red Hot held club nights around the world spotlighting top dance performers and DJs. These parties were filmed for an AIDS awareness television special and released on home video.

In 1993, Red Hot released, No Alternative, produced by Paul Heck, which featured Nirvana, the Beastie Boys, Smashing Pumpkins and Soul Asylum and received an A+ by Entertainment Weekly. It features original tracks and covers from bands that went on to define the alternative rock scene of the 1990s. An MTV special and home video featured live performances, music videos, and information about AIDS for an audience otherwise untargeted by other AIDS organizations.

Red Hot + Country was released in 1994 by Mercury Nashville. The album – which received an A− from Entertainment Weekly, features music from the classic country and classic rock genres performed by an assortment of seasoned old and new country music artists including Dolly Parton, Crosby, Stills & Nash, Jackson Browne and many others. The album received two Grammy nominations. A live show was held at the Ryman Auditorium, the ancestral home to the Grand Ole Opry. A recording of the live show was eventually released on home video.

In 1995: Time magazine listed Red Hot's Stolen Moments: Red Hot + Cool as its number one pick for the Best Music of 1994. One of the first projects to explore the impact of AIDS upon the African American community, the CD features collaborations between old school jazz performers and contemporary hip hop artists including: Donald Byrd, MC Solaar, Digable Planets, The Pharcyde, Don Cherry, Branford Marsalis, Alice Coltrane and many others. 
The high concept: to match some of the most exciting performers in hip-hop with some of the finest performers in jazz ... The result: a landmark album that brilliantly harnesses the fire of rap and the cool of jazz, transcending genres and generations."

A documentary film focusing on the impact of AIDS on communities of color was broadcast on PBS in tandem with the album release, and released on home video by PolyGram Video.

1995 brought Red Hot + Bothered—an anthology of the indie rock scene from the 1990s. The recording initially appeared as a pair of 10" EP recordings (Red Hot + Bothered, Volume I, Number 1 and Red Hot + Bothered Volume I, Number 2), bundled with limited edition fanzines, spoofing dating guides with advice from well-known artists and writers aimed at reaching the audience on a variety of issues, including relationships, love, sex and the impact of AIDS. The EP recordings were eventually followed-up by a full-length CD including several tracks absent on the vinyl EPs.

Offbeat: A Red Hot Soundtrip and America Is Dying Slowly (another acronym for AIDS) followed in 1996. Offbeat combines elements of ambient, spoken word, and hip hop to expand the ideas of artistic collage and spiritual transcendence of the Beat. The album is an offshoot of a larger project called The Beat Experience, which explored the legacy of the Beat movement. America Is Dying Slowly features collaborations from several hip hop acts, including Mobb Deep, De La Soul, Coolio, Biz Markie, Chubb Rock, The Lost Boyz, Pete Rock, and Wu-Tang Clan. Dubbed "a masterpiece" by The Source on its release, AIDS was one of the first of such efforts aimed at reaching out to African American men through pop culture.

1996: Red Hot + Rio is a contemporary tribute to the Bossa Nova sounds that has seduced people around the globe for decades, in particular the music of the great composer and arranger Antonio Carlos Jobim. This transcontinental pop record puts a modern spin on the magical ambiance and music that was Ipanema in the 1960s.

1997: Red Hot + Latin: Silencio = Muerte, originally released in 1997 on Jellybean Benitez' H.O.L.A Recordings, was the tenth album in the Red Hot series created to fund the fight against AIDS in Latin America and the Latino community. The pairing of artists like David Byrne and Café Tacuba reflected a cultural encounter far ahead of its time that continues to provide a music-without-language-barriers soundtrack for the multi-cultural American experience. When Red Hot + Latin was originally released, the album was the subject of an MTV special that received widespread critical praise and aired worldwide

1998: Like many epidemics, AIDS spread along major trade and travel routes. Onda Sonora: Red Hot + Lisbon (sound wave) follows the Portuguese travel routes by fusing elements from many cultures. It features 40 artists from 11 countries singing in 7 languages. Yet underlying these diverse origins is a common connection beyond their heritageña message of hope and love. This project was created in conjunction with the 1998 World Expo in Lisbon, Portugal. A donation of $100,000 was made in Red Hot's name by Imperio Seguradora, helping Red Hot raise AIDS awareness in the Portuguese-speaking world, where reliable AIDS information is desperately needed.

1998: Twentieth-Century Blues: The Songs of Noël Coward is a 1998 Noël Coward tribute album curated by Neil Tennant, who invited prominent artists of the day to reinterpret Noël Coward's songs for the late 20th century. Profits from the albums sale were donated to the Red Hot AIDS Charitable Trust.

1998: Red Hot + Rhapsody is a contemporary tribute to the classic George Gershwin songs that have seduced listeners for nearly a century. In the spirit of RED HOT + BLUE, this project brings together a diverse set of performers to reinterpret the Gershwins' music for new audiences.

1999: Optic Nerve is an interactive, CD-ROM showcasing the life and work of multimedia artist David Wojnarowicz. The disc includes film, interviews, music, performance, painting and writing from the artist. The release is the first entry in the Red Hot AIDS Benefit Series with a non-musical focus. Production was handled by the Red Hot Organization (RHO) and Funny Garbage, in conjunction with the New Museum of Contemporary Art exhibit entitled "Fever: The Art of David Wojnarowicz."

Safe Sex = Hot Sex
In an effort to spread its message, Red Hot created a "Safe Sex is Hot Sex" campaign in 1992, consisting of postcards, flyers and posters, taken by famed photographers Steven Meisel and Bruce Weber. Images used include homosexual and heterosexual couples, interracial or not, engaged in intimate, erotic poses.

"Recognizing that traditional health education methods were frequently ineffective, the creators of this poster use the combination of visual and textual messages to normalize and eroticize safe sex. The carefully positioned subjects in the photographs are provocative and instructional--the educational goal is to influence individuals to adopt specific behaviors. The voyeuristic presentation works in conjunction with the message: sex can be enjoyable and safe for homosexual men."

Also part of the campaign was the creation of several movies. Shot by Lance Acord on 16 MM in black and white, the videos portray young models, scantily clad, frolicking in a bucolic setting. Bennett Miller (director of Capote with Philip Seymour Hoffman) was an assistant on the film.

The 21st century
2001: Red Hot + Indigo, a tribute to the legacy of Duke Ellington, was the 13th album in the Red Hot AIDS benefit series. This project followed suit with Red Hot + Blue, Red Hot + Rio and Red Hot + Rhapsody by featuring modern acts reinterpreting the work of one of the 20th century's greatest songwriters.

2002: Red Hot + Riot is a tribute to the great songs of Fela Anikulapo Kuti. It combines contemporary musicians from across the African Diaspora in urban America, Brazil, Cuba, Europe and West Africa, including his son, Femi Kuti, and drummer, Tony Allen, along with a cross-section of some of the most creative musicians in the world. The collaborations are not just musical, but also symbolic of how people need to work together to achieve the positive life force embodied in Fela's music and spirit.

2006: Red Hot released a special two-disc set of the celebrated tribute to Cole Porter, Red Hot + Blue, which included a remastered version of the original album and a DVD with music videos directed by cinematic luminaries Jim Jarmusch, Wim Wenders and Jonathan Demme, among many others.

In 2009, Red Hot released Dark Was The Night, an indie rock album that generated donations of over $1 million. It features exclusive recordings by a number of independent artists and production by Aaron and Bryce Dessner of The National. The title is derived from the Blind Willie Johnson song "Dark Was the Night, Cold Was the Ground," which is covered on this collection by the Kronos Quartet. On 26 October 2009, it was announced on 4AD's website that profits raised by the compilation for the benefit of AIDS/HIV awareness and prevention amounted to £423,212 ($668,358), a sum that represents all the profits from worldwide sales for the first half of 2009. A Dark Was the Night Live concert followed at Radio City Music Hall on May 3, 2009. The concert was released as a DVD and included footage from the show, as well as exclusive rehearsal scenes, interviews and promotional performances featuring Andrew Bird, Dirty Projectors, The National, Colin Meloy, David Sitek and Yeasayer - plus more from David Byrne, Bon Iver, My Brightest Diamond, Sharon Jones & The Dap-Kings and Feist.

On December 3 and 4, 2010, The Red Hot series returned to the Next Wave Festival at the Brooklyn Academy of Music (BAM) with Red Hot + New Orleans LIVE, saluting the music of the Crescent City in recognition of World AIDS Day (Dec 1) with part of the proceeds benefiting the New Orleans' AIDS Tasks Force. Directed by Grammy nominee Trombone Shorty, Red Hot + New Orleans featured Trombone Shorty and Orleans Avenue, Dr. John, Irma Thomas, Kermit Ruffins, Ledisi, Marc Broussard, Ivan Neville, Partners-N-Crime, Mannie Fresh, Roger Lewis, Phil and Keith Frazier, with video Design by Yuki Nakajima and stage design by Alex Delaunay.

Red Hot + Rio 2
RED HOT + RIO 2, produced by Béco Dranoff, John Carlin, and Paul Heck; with supervising musical producers Andres Levin, Mario Caldato Jr., and Kamal Kassin; in collaboration with U.S. label E1 Entertainment, is Red Hot Organization's next entry into its series of tribute albums created to raise money for HIV/AIDS awareness and prevention. Consisting of 34 original recordings featuring unique collaborations involving over 60 international and Brazilian stars, RIO 2 is a cutting-edge tribute to the influential Tropicália movement that rocked Brazil's cultural and political landscape in the late 1960s. In addition, RIO 2 is a 15-year celebration of the first Red Hot + Rio project released to great acclaim in 1996.

Featuring world class performers such as John Legend, Caetano Veloso, Seu Jorge, Beirut, Bebel Gilberto, Of Montreal, Aloe Blacc, Marisa Monte and more, RIO 2 will create a sunny Brazilian groove by updating the sounds of the Tropicália era for a new generation of listeners.
The project follows Red Hot's latest successful benefit album, Dark Was The Night (Beggars Banquet, 2009), which features top indie-rock artists such as Arcade Fire, The National, Feist, Grizzly Bear, Bon Iver, David Byrne and many others and raised over $1 million for AIDS relief.

RIO 2 follows the rich Brazilian musical journey from boss nova into the 'Tropicalista' universe envisioned by Caetano Veloso, Gilberto Gil, Tom Zé, Gal Costa, Os Mutantes – bringing its forward-thinking global message to today's global youth and music lovers of all ages. Artists appearing on Rio 2 include:

Alice Smith, Almaz, Aloe Blacc, Angélique Kidjo, Apollo Nove, Atom, Bebel Gilberto, Beck, Beirut, Brazilian Girls, Carlinhos Brown, Caetano Veloso, Céu, Clara Moreno, Cults, Curumin, Devendra Banhart, DJ Dolores, Emicida, Fernanda Takai, Forró In The Dark, Fred 04, Garotas Suecas, Gogol Bordello, Isaar, Javelin, John Legend, José González, Joyce, Los Van Van, Marcos Valle, Marina Gasolina, Madlib, Marisa Monte, Mayra Andrade, Mia Doi Todd, Money Mark, Moreno Veloso, N.A.S.A., Of Montreal, Om'mas Keith, Orq. Contemporânea de Olinda, Os Mutantes, Otto, Phenomenal Handclap Band, Prefuse 73, Quadron, Rodrigo Amarante, Rita Lee, Secousse, Seu Jorge, Super Human Happiness, Tha Boogie, Thalma de Freitas, Thank Frank, Tom Zé, Toshiyuki Yasuda, Trio Mocotó, Twin Danger, and Vanessa da Mata.

Rio 2 was reviewed by critics to high acclaim. The Wall Street Journal noted that the album possessed "unusual collaboration and combinations" that would solidify Red Hot's place "in the musical landscape."

The Denver Post stated that the album was full of "summery, breezy songs" that alternately "surprises and triumphs" and ultimately deemed it "one of the most listenable records to come across our desk in months."

The Huffington Post noted the success of Red Hot on a number of different levels by stating, "The Red Hot albums are really a double public service: they bring the world into your music player, and they keep hope alive." They concluded by urging readers to "Buy Red Hot + Rio 2 now. It's cheaper than a ticket to South America, and it's more uplifting than reading the latest AIDS stats."

Discography
 Red Hot + Blue (1990)
 Red Hot + Dance (1992)
 No Alternative (1993)
 Red Hot + Bothered (1993)
 Red Hot + Country (1994)
 Red Hot + Cool: Stolen Moments (1994)
 Offbeat: A Red Hot Soundtrip (1996)
 America Is Dying Slowly (1996)
 Red Hot + Rio (1996)
 Red Hot + Latin: Silencio = Muerte (1997)
 Red Hot + Lisbon: Onda Sonora (1998)
 Red Hot + Rhapsody (1998)
 Red Hot + Indigo (2000)
 Red Hot + Riot: The Music and Spirit of Fela Kuti (2002)
 Dark Was the Night (2009)
 Red Hot + Rio 2 (2011)
 Red Hot + Fela (2013)
 Red Hot + Bach (2014)
 Master Mix: Red Hot + Arthur Russell (2014)
 Day of the Dead (2016)

Compilations
 Red Hot On Impulse (1994)
 Nova Bossa: Red Hot On Verve (1996)
 By George (& Ira): Red Hot on Gershwin (1998)
 Twentieth-Century Blues: The Songs of Noel Coward (1998)

Multimedia releases
 Optic Nerve (1999)
 Red Hot + Bach (in production)

Filmography
 Red Hot + Blue (VHS) (1990)
 No Alternative (VHS) (1993)
 Stolen Moments: Red Hot + Cool (VHS) (1994)

Red Hot + TV

Reviews
A review of a 1994 Red Hot Organization one-hour music video collection noted that the affected persons depicted in the video were either gay males, injection drug users, or African. Some researchers argued that depictions such as this focus the majority viewers' attention specifically on these groups and assume that HIV is a problem for minorities, and not for the general public.

References

External links
Red Hot Online Official site
Red Hot + Riot Red Hot operated website provides additional information on the compilation to honour Fela Anikulapo-Kuti.
Dark Was The Night Website for Dark Was The Night, Red Hot 2009 charity album
Guide to the Red Hot Organization's Papers at NYU's Fales Library

HIV/AIDS activism
Non-profit organizations based in New York City
501(c)(3) organizations